Yuwangtai District is a district of the city of Kaifeng, Henan province, China.

It is named after a shrine dedicated to Yu the Great, a legendary ruler in ancient China famed for his introduction of flood control. The temple was built in 1523 during the Ming Dynasty amid frequent flooding by the Yellow River. The paifang at the base of the temple, built in 1762 during the Qing Dynasty, reads "Platform of the Ancient Performance", named for a musician, Shikuang, who used to play there during the Spring and Autumn period.

Administrative divisions
As of 2012, this district is divided to 5 subdistricts and 2 townships.
Subdistricts

Townships
Nanjiao Township
Wangtun Township

References

County-level divisions of Henan